Johannes Hermanus Steyn (born 8 October 1995) is a South African rugby union player who last played in the Currie Cup with the . His regular position is at scrum-half.

Rugby career

2008–2014 : Schoolboy / SWD Under-19 rugby

Steyn was born and grew up in Oudtshoorn.

In 2011, he represented SWD at the Under-16 Grant Khomo Week in Queenstown and he was also included in a World Sport Barbarians team that competed in Portugal and Spain, where Steyn was named the best backline player. He also broke through to his school Langenhoven Gimnasium's first team in 2011. In 2012, he was named the vice=captain of his school team and was selected to represent the SWD, this time at the Under-18 Academy Week held IN Wellington. He captained the team and was voted the best backline player of the competition.

He captained his school side in 2012, and was again selected to captain the SWD team at the Under-18 Academy Week held at Glenwood High School in Durban. He was also included in the  squad for their participation in the 2013 Under-19 Provincial Championship. He appeared in their final four matches of the regular season, as the team finished fourth in Group B to secure a title play-off berth. He scored 11 points for his side in their semi-final match against , but it was in vain as the side from the East Rand won 29–24. Steyn was again named his team's best backline player for the competition.

After school, Steyn moved to George to join the  academy. He made three starts for the  team in the 2014 Under-19 Provincial Championship, scoring 12 points with the boot as the team finished in sixth place, missing out on the play-offs.

2015–2016 : SWD Eagles

Steyn was included in the  squad for the 2015 Vodacom Cup. He also started their next match against  in his only other appearance in the competition. The SWD Eagles finished bottom of the log with a single victory to their name, which meant they would play in the Currie Cup First Division for the remainder of the season. After a single appearance for the  team in the Under-21 Provincial Championship, Steyn returned to the first team, where he featured in all five of their matches during the First Division regular season. The team recovered from their poor showing in the qualification series, winning four matches to finish in third spot on the log.

Steyn played in all fourteen of the SWD Eagles' matches in the 2016 Currie Cup qualification competition, starting nine of those and playing off the bench in five matches.

2017–present : Kings

In November 2016, the  Super Rugby team announced that they contracted Steyn for the 2017 Super Rugby season.

References

South African rugby union players
Living people
1995 births
People from Oudtshoorn
Rugby union scrum-halves
SWD Eagles players
Southern Kings players
Rugby union players from the Western Cape